Harold John Charles (26 June 1914 – 11 December 1987) was an Anglican priest.

Charles was born into an ecclesiastical family and educated at Keble College, Oxford. Ordained in 1938, he began his career with a curacy at Abergwili. After this he was the Bishop's Messenger for the Diocese of Swansea and Brecon until 1948 and then warden of the University Church Hostel, Bangor and a lecturer at University College until 1952.  He was then vicar of St James' Bangor and then in 1954 the warden of St Michael's College, Llandaff. In 1957 he became Dean of St Asaph and in 1971 its diocesan bishop. He retired in 1982.

References

1914 births
Alumni of Keble College, Oxford
Academics of Bangor University
Deans of St Asaph
Bishops of St Asaph
20th-century bishops of the Church in Wales
1987 deaths
Alumni of St Michael's College, Llandaff
Wardens of St Michael's College, Llandaff